{{Infobox settlement
| name                   =  
| image_skyline          =  
| image_caption          = 
| image_flag             = Flag of Pierto Diaz, Sorsogon.png
| flag_size              = 120x80px
| image_seal             =   
| seal_size              = 100x80px
| image_map              = 
| map_caption            = 
| image_map1             = 
| pushpin_map            = Philippines
| pushpin_label_position = left
| pushpin_map_caption    = Location within the 
| coordinates            = 
| settlement_type        = 
| subdivision_type       = Country
| subdivision_name       = Philippines
| subdivision_type1      = Region
| subdivision_name1      = 
| subdivision_type2      = Province
| subdivision_name2      = 
| official_name          = 
| etymology              =  
| named_for              =  
| native_name            =
| other_name             = Montufar
| nickname               =
| motto                  =
| anthem                 =
| subdivision_type3      = District
| subdivision_name3      = 
| established_title      = Founded
| established_date       = 
| parts_type             = Barangays
| parts_style            = para
| p1                     =   (see Barangays)
| leader_title           =  
| leader_name            = Benito L. Doma
| leader_title1          = Vice Mayor
| leader_name1           = Romeo D. Domasian
| leader_title2          = Representative 
| leader_name2           = Vacant
| leader_title3          = Municipal Council
| leader_name3           = 
| leader_title4          = Electorate 
| leader_name4           =  voters
| government_type        = 
| government_footnotes   = 
| elevation_m            = 
| elevation_max_m        = 136
| elevation_min_m        = -1
| elevation_max_rank     =
| elevation_min_rank     =
| elevation_footnotes    = 
| elevation_max_footnotes= 
| elevation_min_footnotes= 
| area_rank              =
| area_footnotes         = 
| area_total_km2         = 
| population_footnotes   = 
| population_total       = 
| population_as_of       = 
| population_density_km2 = auto
| population_blank1_title= Households
| population_blank1      =  
| population_blank2_title= 
| population_blank2      = 
| population_demonym     =
| population_rank        =
| population_note        =
| timezone               = PST
| utc_offset             = +8
| postal_code_type       = ZIP code
| postal_code            = 
| postal2_code_type      = 
| postal2_code           = 
| area_code_type         = 
| area_code              = 
| website                = 
| demographics_type1     = Economy
| demographics1_title1   = 
| demographics1_info1    = 
| demographics1_title2   = Poverty incidence
| demographics1_info2    = %
| demographics1_title3   = Revenue
| demographics1_info3    =   
| demographics1_title4   = Revenue rank
| demographics1_info4    = 
| demographics1_title5   = Assets
| demographics1_info5    =   
| demographics1_title6   = Assets rank
| demographics1_info6    = 
| demographics1_title7   = IRA
| demographics1_info7    =  
| demographics1_title8   = IRA rank
| demographics1_info8    = 
| demographics1_title9   = Expenditure
| demographics1_info9    =   
| demographics1_title10  = Liabilities
| demographics1_info10   =  
| demographics_type2     = Service provider 
| demographics2_title1   = Electricity
| demographics2_info1    = 
| demographics2_title2   = Water
| demographics2_info2    =  
| demographics2_title3   = Telecommunications
| demographics2_info3    = 
| demographics2_title4   = Cable TV
| demographics2_info4    =
| demographics2_title5   = 
| demographics2_info5    =
| demographics2_title6   = 
| demographics2_info6    =
| demographics2_title7   = 
| demographics2_info7    =
| demographics2_title8   = 
| demographics2_info8    =
| demographics2_title9   = 
| demographics2_info9    =
| demographics2_title10  = 
| demographics2_info10   =
| blank_name_sec1        = 
| blank_info_sec1        = 
| blank1_name_sec1       = Native languages
| blank1_info_sec1       = 
| blank2_name_sec1       = Crime index
| blank2_info_sec1       = 
| blank3_name_sec1       = 
| blank3_info_sec1       = 
| blank4_name_sec1       = 
| blank4_info_sec1       = 
| blank5_name_sec1       = 
| blank5_info_sec1       = 
| blank6_name_sec1       = 
| blank6_info_sec1       = 
| blank7_name_sec1       = 
| blank7_info_sec1       = 
| blank1_name_sec2       = Major religions
| blank1_info_sec2       = 
| blank2_name_sec2       = Feast date
| blank2_info_sec2       = 
| blank3_name_sec2       = Catholic diocese
| blank3_info_sec2       =
| blank4_name_sec2       = Patron saint 
| blank4_info_sec2       = 
| blank5_name_sec2       = 
| blank5_info_sec2       = 
| blank6_name_sec2       = 
| blank6_info_sec2       = 
| blank7_name_sec2       = 
| blank7_info_sec2       =
| short_description      =
| footnotes              =
}}

Prieto Diaz, officially the Municipality of Prieto Diaz, is a 5th class municipality in the province of Sorsogon, Philippines. According to the 2020 census, it has a population of 22,644 people.

History
The town of Prieto-Diaz was once a Visita of the old Municipality of Bacon (now Bacon District of Sorsogon City). The town was given its present name from the surnames of the two Bicolano martyrs, Father Gabriel Prieto (1853–1897) and Father Severino Diaz (1862–1897) when it became independent from the Municipality of Bacon on October 12, 1903, by virtue of Act 940 of the Philippine Commission. Prieto-Diaz was the only town organized after Sorsogon became a Province on October 17, 1894.

Geography
Prieto-Diaz is 387 km (241 mi) southeast of Manila, 150 km(31m) east-southeast of Legazpi City, the regional center and 20 km (12.4 mi) north-north-east of Sorsogon City, the provincial capital. North of Prieto-Diaz across Albay Gulf is Rapu-Rapu, Albay, on the west is Bacon District of Sorsogon City and on the south is Gubat, Sorsogon while Pacific Ocean is on the east. It is also the easternmost point on the Island of Luzon.

Barangays
Prieto-Diaz is politically subdivided into 23 barangays. In 1954, sitio Carayat was converted into a barrio.

Climate

Prieto-Diaz has a tropical climate. There is significant rainfall throughout the year in Prieto-Diaz. Even the driest month still has a lot of rainfall. According to Köppen and Geiger, climate in Prieto-Diaz is classified as Af. The average annual temperature in Prieto-Diaz is 27.1 °C. The average annual rainfall is 2965 mm. The driest month is April with 119 mm. Most precipitation falls in December, with an average of 514 mm. The warmest month of the year is June with an average temperature of 28.2 °C. In January, the average temperature is 25.6 °C. It is the lowest average temperature of the whole year. The difference in precipitation between the driest month and the wettest month is 395 mm. The average temperatures vary during the year by 2.6 °C.

Typhoons are especially frequent and are destructive menaces in the Bicol region. The months of September, October and November experience more destruction from the violent tropical storms. Forty percent of the storms carrying high-velocity winds in the Philippine passes through southeastern part of Luzon where Prieto Diaz is located.

Demographics

Sorsogon Ayta Language
In 2010, UNESCO released its 3rd world volume of Endangered Languages in the World, where 3 critically endangered languages were in the Philippines. One of these languages in the Southern Ayta (Sorsogon Ayta) language which has an estimated speaker of 150 people in the year 2000. The language was classified as Critically Endangered'', meaning the youngest speakers are grandparents and older, and they speak the language partially and infrequently and hardly pass the language to their children and grandchildren anymore. If the remaining 150 people do not pass their native language to the next generation of Sorsogon Ayta people, their indigenous language will be extinct within a period of 1 to 2 decades.

The Sorsogon Ayta people live only on the municipality of Prieto-Diaz, Sorsogon. They are one of the original Negrito settlers in the entire Philippines. They belong to the Aeta people classification but have distinct language and belief systems unique to their own culture and heritage.

Economy

Government
The following are the elected officials of Prieto-Diaz, Sorsogon for the term 2013-2016

Education

Prieto-Diaz have 19 elementary schools and 3 secondary schools directly supervised by Department of Education - Division of Sorsogon.

List of primary schools

List of secondary schools 
Calao National High School
Manlabong National High School
Prieto-Diaz National High School

References

External links
 Prieto Diaz Profile at PhilAtlas.com
 [ Philippine Standard Geographic Code]
 Philippine Census Information
 Local Governance Performance Management System

Municipalities of Sorsogon